Balls was a Philippine pay television network based in Quezon City. It was notable for being the country's first local high-definition TV channel. It was owned and operated by ABS-CBN's subsidiary ABS-CBN Cable Channels. The network shows notable sports broadcasts from the Philippines and abroad, as well as other sports related programming. Its local programming were produced and licensed by ABS-CBN Sports.

Background
Balls was officially launched on January 1, 2008, the same day that fellow ABS-CBN subsidiary Sky Cable dropped the channels of Solar Entertainment Corporation (including the sports channels Solar Sports and Basketball TV) from its lineup. These channels were replaced by a group of new channels owned by ABS-CBN's subsidiary Creative Programs Inc. (now ABS-CBN Cable Channels), which include Maxxx and Velvet. While SkyCable officials stated that the channels were being replaced to reduce redundancy in SkyCable's lineup and introduce new programming to the service, reports surfaced that the two companies had failed to reach a carriage deal since ABS-CBN had accused Solar of cannibalizing the revenue of its over-the-air networks. Some reports says that the dispute has to do with Manny Pacquiao's exclusive contract with ABS-CBN's main competitor GMA Network, which Solar has partnered for free TV airing of its boxing matches.

Although Balls was intended to effectively replace it, Basketball TV was restored to the SkyCable lineup in time for the 2008–09 NBA season in October 2008, and other Solar channels also returned to the lineup afterward.

It was announced that Balls and Balls HD will cease their broadcast on December 31, 2015. Its HD channel, as well as the entire channel's content (except the Ultimate Fighting Championship which the broadcast rights was acquired by TV5's sports division, Sports5) will be absorbed to the Sports + Action brand and renamed as ABS-CBN Sports + Action HD.

The last program to air on this channel was a replay of UFC 194: Aldo vs. McGregor on December 31, 2015, before signing off at 12 midnight on January 1, 2016. Cable providers still receiving Balls would see an imaging card that reads "Balls is now signing off". Until the provider can replace it with another channel, while other providers like Sky Cable (in Metro Manila and in select metropolitan and large cities) have replaced this channel with a reserved channel or with another channel, with Sky Cable replacing it with ABS-CBN Sports+Action

High-definition feed
On July 11, 2009, the channel launched its own high-definition feed on Sky Cable, marking the Philippines' first ever local high-definition television channel. On the same day, Balls also televised the country's first locally produced programs in HD, which included a UAAP college basketball game, followed by an NCAA game the following Monday, all produced by ABS-CBN Sports using the recently acquired Sony high-definition professional video cameras and a state-of-the-art HD OB van with technologies developed by EVS Broadcast Equipment, Snell, and Avid Technology. Balls HD was in hibernation from December 28, 2009 until 2013.

Programming
Balls' initial lineup focused on ball sports such as football, basketball, golf, tennis, and volleyball (as suggested by its name). Balls also aired 2 of 4 Tennis Grand Slam Tournament which is French Open (2008–2013; transferred to Fox Sports Asia) and US Open (2007–2015). Balls later expanded its lineup to include boxing, UFC MMA events, WWE programs, and the 2011 Southeast Asian Games. It also carries all the matches of FIFA World Cup which is exclusively licensed to ABS-CBN Sports. While originally airing only foreign events since its inception, Balls began to air domestic events produced by ABS-CBN Sports in 2009, beginning with NCAA Season 85 and UAAP Season 72.

References

External links
 sports.abs-cbn.com/BallsChannel

Creative Programs
Television channels and stations established in 2008
Sports television networks in the Philippines
Defunct television networks in the Philippines
Men's interest channels
Television channels and stations disestablished in 2015
ABS-CBN Corporation channels